Herrawi Group is a multimillion-dollar B2B company in Alexandria, Egypt. It produces artichokes and packed oranges for several brands including Cleopatra, Tut Fresh and Pharaoh Oranges.

History
Herrawi Group was established in 1981 by the family of the same name. They owned  of land in Egypt where artichokes were grown in the 1930s.

Subsidiaries
Froca Agro Industries
Egypt Rice Export Company
Citrus Packing House
Skateimpact (Skateboard distribution and online skateshop)

Certifications
EurepGap
IFS
Kosher

External links

Official Herrawi Group website'

Agriculture companies of Egypt
Food companies of Egypt
Food and drink companies established in 1981
1981 establishments in Egypt
Companies based in Alexandria